Focus Learning Trust is a registered charity which operates a network of private schools (known as OneSchool Global UK schools) in the United Kingdom that are affiliated to the Plymouth Brethren Christian Church.

The schools have a non-selective intake of pupils from the Plymouth Brethren Christian Church. Focus Learning Trust was first formed in 2003 and has a head office in Warwick, England.

List of OneSchool Global UK schools

Primary schools
OneSchool Global UK Hartford
OneSchool Global UK Northampton
OneSchool Global UK Scunthorpe
OneSchool Global UK Shinfield

Secondary schools

OneSchool Global UK Alloa
OneSchool Global UK Atherstone
OneSchool Global UK Balmedie
OneSchool Global UK Berkeley
OneSchool Global UK Biggleswade
OneSchool Global UK Dunstable
OneSchool Global UK Gloucester
OneSchool Global UK Hartford
OneSchool Global UK Hindhead
OneSchool Global UK Hornby
OneSchool Global UK Kenley
OneSchool Global UK Knockloughrim
OneSchool Global UK Linton
OneSchool Global UK Long Eaton
OneSchool Global UK Newry
OneSchool Global UK Newtown
OneSchool Global UK Plymouth
OneSchool Global UK Reading
OneSchool Global UK Scunthorpe
OneSchool Global UK Stoke-by-Nayland
OneSchool Global UK Swaffham
OneSchool Global UK Swansea
OneSchool Global UK Wilton
OneSchool Global UK York

References

External links
Focus Learning Trust official website

Plymouth Brethren
Christian schools in England
2003 establishments in the United Kingdom
Private school organisations in England
Organizations established in 2003
Organisations based in Warwickshire
Associations of schools